Kings of Chaos may refer to:
 Kings of Chaos (album), a 1999 album by Hecate Enthroned
 Kings of Chaos (band), a rock supergroup